Tsallagov is a surname. Notable people with the surname include:

 Ibragim Tsallagov (born 1990), Russian footballer
 Marat Tsallagov (born 1982), Russian footballer

Russian-language surnames